
Hans-Wilhelm Doering-Manteuffel (17 July 1898 – 21 January 1963) was a general in the Luftwaffe of Nazi Germany during World War II. He was a recipient of the Knight's Cross of the Iron Cross.

Awards and decorations

 Knight's Cross of the Iron Cross on 10 September 1944 as Generalmajor and commander of Flak-Regiment 101

References

Citations

Bibliography

 

1898 births
1963 deaths
People from Wołów
People from the Province of Silesia
Luftwaffe World War II generals
German Army personnel of World War I
Prussian Army personnel
Recipients of the clasp to the Iron Cross, 2nd class
Recipients of the Gold German Cross
Recipients of the Knight's Cross of the Iron Cross
German prisoners of war in World War II held by the United States
Reichswehr personnel
Major generals of the Luftwaffe